David McFaull (November 10, 1948 – July 25, 1997) was an American sailor. He won a silver medal in the Tornado class with Michael Rothwell at the 1976 Summer Olympics in Montreal.

References
 Profile at sports-reference.com

1948 births
1997 deaths
American male sailors (sport)
Sportspeople from Honolulu
Sailors at the 1976 Summer Olympics – Tornado
Olympic silver medalists for the United States in sailing
Medalists at the 1976 Summer Olympics